This table displays the top-rated primetime television series of the 1964–65 season as measured by Nielsen Media Research.

References

1964 in American television
1965 in American television
1964-related lists
1965-related lists
Lists of American television series